Ymer Xhaferi (Serbo-Croat: Imer Džaferi) (born 6 November 1985 in Titova Mitrovica) is a Kosovar-Albanian football midfielder playing for Finnish lower league side TiPS.

Club career
Before moving to Finland, Xhaferri played in Kosovo's main KF KEK team.

References and notes

External links
Ymer Xhaferi

1985 births
Living people
Sportspeople from Mitrovica, Kosovo
Association football midfielders
Kosovan footballers
KF Trepça'89 players
KF Besa players
AC Oulu players
Oulun Luistinseura players
PK-35 Vantaa (men) players
KF KEK players
FF Jaro players
FK Renova players
Myllykosken Pallo −47 players
Veikkausliiga players
Kosovan expatriate footballers
Expatriate footballers in Finland
Kosovan expatriate sportspeople in Finland
Expatriate footballers in North Macedonia
Kosovan expatriate sportspeople in North Macedonia